Cleal is a surname. Notable people with the surname include:

Kane Cleal (born 1984), Australian rugby league footballer
Matthew Cleal (born 1969), British cricketer
Noel Cleal (born 1958), Australian rugby league footballer 
Ossie Cleal (1916–1977), New Zealand association football player
Peter Cleal (1903–1979), Australian rules footballer